Count John Louis of Nassau-Saarbrücken (19 October 1472, in Saarbrücken – 4 June 1545, in ibid.) was the posthumous son of Count John II and his second wife, Elisabeth of Württemberg-Urach.

In 1492, he married Elisabeth (1469–1500), the daughter of Count Palatine Louis I of Zweibrücken.  They had the following children:
Ottilie (1492–1554), married John V of Sayn in 1516
Anna (1493–1565)
Elisabeth (1495–1559)
Johanna (1496–1566)
Margaret (b. 1497)
Felicitas (b. 1499)

After Elisabeth's death, John remarried in 1506 to Catherine of Moers-Saarwerden (1491–1547).  They had the following children:
 Philip II (1509–1554)
 John III, married Adelaide of Kronengracht,
 Margaret (1513–1562)
 Elisabeth (1515–1568)
 Catherine (1517–1553), married in 1537 to Count Emich IX of Leiningen-Dagsburg
 Agnes (b. 1519)
 John Louis (1524–1542)
 Adolph I (1526–1559), married in 1553 to Anastasia of Isenburg-Grenzau

Ancestry

House of Nassau
Counts of Nassau
1472 births
1545 deaths
15th-century German people
16th-century German people
Burials at Stiftskirche Sankt Arnual (Saarbrücken)